Risod is a city and a municipal council in Washim district in the Indian state of Maharashtra. Risod is also a major market place for the people from  Hingoli district as well as Risod tahsil.

Penganga is major river flowing from Risod taluka it is a tributary of River Godavari. Major Cities near Risod are: Nanded (140 km) away, Sambhajinagar (Aurangabad)180 km away, Nagpur 323 km away, Pune 430 km away, Mumbai 500 km away. Major airports (Commercial) near Risod are: Dr. Babasaheb Ambedkar International Airport, Nagpur Chatrapati Sambhajimaharaj Airport Sambhajinagar (Aurangabad). Shri Guru Gobind Singh Airport, Nanded and emergency airports near Risod are Akola and Yavatmal. Major Railway stations near Risod are: Hingoli, Akola and Washim.

About 
Risod got its name from word Rushivat (ऋषिवट). City got different names as per times. In Jain granths and British letters city was written as Risvad. In 2006 in an excavation more than 5000 coins of Satvahan dyanasty were found. Satvahana dyanasty was dyanasty in C.E. 230 this kingdom came into existence after  Maurya Empire declined. After death of  Ashoka  Satvahana dynasty announced themselves democratic (free from them) brought their own coin made of Lead in market. They purchased these coins form  Roman Empire. Those coins were found as mentioned. In C.E. 1500 King Vakataka ruled Washim his written scripts were found some years before in Risod. These written scripts were not full so were given name as Risod Tamrapatra (Copper plates written in Ancient times). As per this scripts King Vakatak Vindhyashakti II gave current city of Risod to Rishi Apap Named Brahmin in charity. In Mahabharat when Pandavas were in vanvas they for sometime lived in Risod. There is Draupadi Kund in city near Siddheshwara temple. Currently 4-5 temples are 1000 years older in Risod. There is temple of Shri Shiddeshwara made in Hemadpanti style before 1000 years There was another temple of Lord Vishnu. Some years before idol of Lord Vishnu was found near this temple. There is well in this temple whose water never goes below level. Yadavas built many temples around 1200 BC. It is said in Betul city of Madhya Pradesh one Brahmin women had dream of Lord Siddheshwara temple of Risod and they came here to pray for having children and god in dream said that the child will protect and serve city as Roop of Lord Shiva. This women after long devotion of Lord Sidheshwara had child in 1853 at ashram in Amravati who was Lord Amardas Baba. He spent his childhood Betul after this he came to Risod for devotion there is no date as such mentioned when he came here but he came on Mahashivratri. He used to wear black coat, dhoti, and white turban on head. His sayings used to be true in future. He took Samadhi (a state of intense concentration achieved through meditation. In yoga this is regarded as the final stage, at which union with the divine is reached before or at death) on 6 sept 1945 it was Monday that day which is day of Lord Shiva. There is on idol of Lord Nandi which is vahan of Lord Shiva tilted its face towards left where Lord Amardas took Samadhi which was straight before. There is big celebration of his anniversary in Bhadrapada month and procession is carried in city this procession is carried out in Mahashivratri also. Once Mumbai based cotton mill caught fire owner named Dagdulalji Bhomavat and his wife Geetabai Bhomavat prayed to Lord Amardas that let my factory go into ash but protect my papers of property after some time they got papers so his wife built big temple which can be seen today. Their son Rahul Bhomavat built Bhomavat Mangal Karyalay and gave it in charity to devote Lord Amardas and in memory of his father and mother. Ajanta Pharma owner Mannalal Agrawal is big devotee of Lord Amardas and he gives its full credit to Lord in memory of his mother he built garden in temple area and gave it in charity. City is famous for Appa Swami Maharaj Temple And Amardas baba temple, Shingala, Pinglakshi Devi temple. City has beautiful lake near Pinglakshi Devi Temple which is known as Pinglakshi lake. Risod was boundary for Central Province and Hydrabad State before 1947. Now Risod is boundary for Vidarbha and Marathwada. Ajanta Pharma Founder and Owner Mannalal Agrawal is from Risod. He spent his childhood in Risod and then went to Mumbai for work meanwhile founded company named Ajanta Pharma Major politicians from Risod are Anantrao Vitthalrao Deshmukh is honorable Indian politician from Maharashtra, and former Minister Of State as Finance, Planning, Employment guarantee scheme, Information and Public relations, Government Of Maharashtra and former member of the Indian National Congress also former Member of Parliament. Now he has his own party called Washim Jilha Janvikas Aghadi. Bhavana Pundlikrao Gawali member of Shivsena (Shinde Gat) and member of parliament from Washim-Yavatmal Loksabha Constituency. Subhashrao Ramrao Zhanak was former Congress member and former Minister for Women and Child development of Maharastra state. Ameet Subhashrao Zhanak present member of Congress also member of Risod-Malegaon Legislative Assembly. Babarao Khadase Patil, NCP leader and Chairman ,Shri. Balaji Sahakari Sut-Girani, has established cotton mill to help farmers and to create jobs for locals.Vijayrao Jadhav former member of Risod-Malegaon Legislative Assembly. Risod city is well connected by roads: SH 183 from Deulgaon Raja via Sindakhed Raja, Lonar, Risod, Wasim, Pusad to Mahagaon connects Aurangabad and Nagpur-Hydrabad National Highway. NH 461B passes through Risod which starts from Malegaon via Risod, Sengaon to Hingoli forming junction for NH 161. SH 206 from Starting from Buldhana via Chikhli, Mehkar to Risod. Famous places nearby Risod are: Narsi Namdeo where Namdeo Maharaj was born and lived. Shirpur (Jain) which is holy place for Jainism. Washim which is famous for ancient Balaji Temple constructed by Bhavani Kaloo who was the Divan of Sabaji Bhosle. Sindakhedraja where Chatrapati Shivaji Maharaj's Mother Jijabai was born. Lonar Crater, Lonar the crater was formed after a comet or an asteroid hit the area at a speed of 90000 km per hour almost 60,000 years ago it is one of three such on Earth.

See also
Deulgaon Banda

References 

Cities and towns in Washim district
Talukas in Maharashtra